The Astounding Award for Best New Writer (formerly the John W. Campbell Award for Best New Writer) is given annually to the best new writer whose first professional work of science fiction or fantasy was published within the two previous calendar years.  It is named after Astounding Science Fiction (now Analog Science Fiction and Fact), a foundational science fiction magazine. The award is sponsored by Dell Magazines, which publishes Analog. 

Between its founding in 1973 and 2019, the award was named after Astoundings long-time editor John W. Campbell, one of the most influential figures in the early history of science fiction. In the aftermath of 2019 winner Jeannette Ng's acceptance speech, in which she described Campbell as a fascist, the science fiction fandom community discussed whether it was appropriate to continue honoring Campbell in this way; the editor of Analog subsequently announced that the award had been renamed.

The nomination and selection process is administered by the World Science Fiction Society (WSFS), represented by the current Worldcon committee, and the award is presented at the Hugo Award ceremony at the Worldcon, although it is not itself a Hugo Award. All nominees receive a pin, while the winner receives a plaque. Beginning in 2005, the award has also included a tiara; created at the behest of 2004 winner Jay Lake and 2005 winner Elizabeth Bear, the tiara is passed from each year's winner to the next.

Eligibility and voting
Writers are eligible for the Astounding Award for two years, and become eligible once they have a work of science fiction or fantasy published in a professional publication. Final decisions on eligibility are decided by the WSFS, but qualifying publications must meet at least one of the following criteria: be accepted by the Science Fiction and Fantasy Writers Association; have at least 10,000 readers; pay the writer at least 8 cents a word and a total of at least US$80; or be self-published or published through a small press, with earnings for the author of at least US$3,000 in one year.

Members of the current and previous Worldcon are eligible to nominate new writers under the same procedures as the Hugo Awards. Initial nominations are made by members in January through March, at which point a shortlist is made of the six most-nominated writers—five prior to 2017—with additional nominees possible in the case of ties. Voting on the ballot of six nominations is performed roughly in April through July, subject to change depending on when that year's Worldcon is held. 

Works by winners and nominees of the award were collected in the New Voices series of anthologies, edited by George R. R. Martin, which had five volumes covering the awards from 1973 through 1977 and which were published between 1977 and 1984. Michael A. Burstein, who was nominated in 1996 and won in 1997, commented that the largest effect of winning or being nominated is not on sales but instead that it gives credibility with established authors and publishers. Criticism has been raised about the award that due to the eligibility requirements it honors writers who become well-known quickly, rather than necessarily the best or most influential authors from a historical perspective.

Over the 50 years the award has been active, 212 writers have been nominated. Of these, 51 authors have won, including one tie. There have been 59 writers who were nominated twice, 20 of whom won the award in their second nomination.

Winners and nominees

In the following table, the years correspond to the date of the ceremony, rather than the year when the writer's eligible work was first published. Each year links to the corresponding "year in literature". Although the award is not given explicitly for any particular work, and such works are not recorded by the World Science Fiction Society or Dell Magazines, a selection of works that the writer in question published in the eligibility period are listed. This list includes novels and short stories, and is not intended to be comprehensive. Entries with a blue background and an asterisk (*) next to the writer's name have won the award; those with a white background are the other nominees on the shortlist.

  *   Winners and joint winners

Citations

Cited references 
 Clute, John; Langford, David; Nicholls, Peter, ed. (2011). The Encyclopedia of Science Fiction (3rd ed.). ESF Ltd.

American literary awards
American speculative fiction awards
Awards established in 1973
Fantasy awards
Lists of speculative fiction-related award winners and nominees
Science fiction awards
Worldcon
1973 establishments in the United States
Naming controversies